The Eddie Eugene and Harriet Cotton Carpenter Farmstead is a historic estate in Lowell, Nebraska. The farmhouse was built in 1910 by Eddie Eugene Carpenter, a farmer. The property includes outbuildings like a barn and a windmill. Carpenter lived here with his wife, Harriet Cotton. The main house was designed in the Queen Anne architectural style, with a Classical Revival porch. It has been listed on the National Register of Historic Places since February 25, 1993.

References

National Register of Historic Places in Kearney County, Nebraska
Queen Anne architecture in Nebraska
Neoclassical architecture in Nebraska
Houses completed in 1910
Farms on the National Register of Historic Places in Nebraska